Windy Saddle may refer to:

 Windy Saddle Park, Jefferson County, Colorado; see Mount Zion (Colorado)
 A feature in the Hells Canyon National Recreation Area, Idaho County, Idaho

See also
 Windy Gap (disambiguation)
 Windy Pass (disambiguation)